There is a current proposal to bring commuter rail service to the Phoenix metropolitan area.

The Arizona Department of Transportation is also currently studying a proposal to create inter-city rail between Tucson and Phoenix, with a corridor along the current I-10 highway. This project is known as the Arizona Passenger Rail Corridor Study (APRCS).

History
Daily rail service had existed until the 1960s between Phoenix, Glendale, and Wickenburg as well as Tempe and Mesa.

Contemporary discussion of commuter rail in Phoenix began with the "Hattie B." flood relief train of 1980, and was first widely promoted in 1991 by the Arizona Rail Passenger Association with the release of its Arizona Rail report.

2010 proposal
The Maricopa Association of Governments (MAG) and the Arizona Department of Transportation are studying suburban commuter rail as a complement to light rail. The MAG Commuter Rail Strategic Plan was released in March 2008.

In April 2008, a coalition of Arizona business and political leaders, including then-Governor Janet Napolitano, proposed a $42 billion state transit plan which would include commuter rail. Commuter rail would run along upgraded existing freight rail lines, with stations every . In Phoenix, as in other areas that have implemented commuter rail, track speeds would be increased, signals updated, and additional sidings and double-track added.

2018 proposal

In October 2018, MAG issued an update to the 2010 study. This update removed the Chandler Corridor from a proposed commuter rail system, as it would have competed with San Tan Corridor Line for ridership. The Kyrene Line Corridor was also extended from its 2010-proposed terminus in West Chandler.

The 2018 update includes four rail corridors which would be operated with two services. The Grand/Kyrene Line would utilize the Grand Line Corridor, traveling from Wittmann southeast towards Phoenix, and then continuing south on the Kyrene Line Corridor to Chandler, traveling  in 66–73 minutes. The Estrella/San Tan Line would use the Estrella Line Corridor, traveling from Buckeye east into Phoenix, and then continuing southeast along the San Tan Line Corridor to Queen Creek, traveling  in 74–82 minutes.

The lines would overlap at four central stations: State Capital, Phoenix, Sky Harbor Airport, and Tempe. Provisions for extensions would allow for an additional Grand Avenue Corridor station in Wickenburg, two additional stations on the San Tan Line Corridor in San Tan Valley and Florence, and an extension of Estrella Line service to Arlington.

Services would run at 30-minute headways during peak hours and 2-hour headways during off-peak hours. By the year 2040, the Grand/Kyrene Line would have 10,850 daily boardings and the Estrella/San Tan Line would have 10,125 daily boardings.

The updated study estimated capital costs for rail systems using diesel multiple units (DMU) or push-pull trainsets (LHC). Capital costs assumed that service would share existing tracks with freight service (operated by Union Pacific Railroad and BNSF Railway), except for the overlapping segment in Phoenix, where there would be two tracks. All tracks would be certified for passenger trains to reach . Costs were estimated at $2.566 billion for DMU service and $2.521 billion for LHC service.

Lines

Grand Line Corridor
The Grand Line Corridor (formerly the Grand Avenue Corridor) is a  line traveling from Union Station in Downtown Phoenix northwest to Wittmann. The corridor utilizes the BNSF Railway's Phoenix Subdivision, which already has sidings for passing trains but lacks any signals.

A trip by car from Union Station to Wittmann utilizing the parallel Grand Avenue (U.S. Route 60) is projected to take 120 minutes by 2040. The population of the surrounding areas of the line – Phoenix, Glendale, Peoria, Youngtown, El Mirage, Surprise, Sun City, Sun City West, and Wittmann – is projected to grow by 46% between 2015 and 2040. In particular, the city of Surprise is forecasted to grow by 152%.

The corridor will serve riders at various colleges and universities, including Arizona State University, Grand Canyon University, and Glendale Community College.

Estrella Line Corridor
The Estrella Line Corridor (formerly the Yuma West Corridor) is a  line traveling from Union Station west to downtown Buckeye by way of the Union Pacific Railroad's Phoenix Subdivision. The line was served by Amtrak's Sunset Limited until June 1996, when it was rerouted to a more direct route via Maricopa rather than of Phoenix.

The population of the surrounding areas – Phoenix, Tolleson, Avondale, Goodyear, and Buckeye – is projected to grow by 63% between 2015 and 2040. In particular, Buckeye and Goodyear are forecasted to grow by 216% and 137%, respectively.

The corridor will serve the Goodyear Spring Training Complex and Phoenix Goodyear Airport, as well as the Palo Verde Nuclear Generating Station should a western extension of the corridor be built to Arlington.

San Tan Line Corridor
The San Tan Line Corridor (formerly the Southeast Corridor) is a  line traveling from Union Station southeast to San Tan Valley by way of Union Pacific's Phoenix Subdivision. The line is a single track with sidings for passing trains.

The population of the surrounding areas – Phoenix, Scottsdale, Tempe, Mesa, Chandler, Gilbert, Queen Creek, and the Salt River Pima-Maricopa Indian Community – is projected to grow by 47% between 2015 and 2040. In particular, Queen Creek is forecasted to grow by 101%.

The corridor will serve airports at Sky Harbor and Mesa and the campuses of Arizona State University and East Valley Institute of Technology.

Kyrene Line Corridor
The Kyrene Line Corridor (formerly the Tempe Corridor) is a  line from Union Station south to Wild Horse Pass Boulevard in the Gila River Indian Community by way of the Union Pacific Railroad's Chandler Industrial Lead . Like the San Tan Line and Estrella Line corridors, this corridor was formerly served by Amtrak until 1996. Signals are still present from Amtrak service and the line is currently a single track.

The population of the surrounding areas – Phoenix, Scottsdale, Tempe, Guadalupe, Chandler, and the Gila River Indian Community is projected to grow by 45% between 2015 and 2040. The greatest population growth is forecasted for the city of Tempe at 50%.

The line will serve Sky Harbor International Airport, the campuses of Arizona State University and the University of Phoenix, the Tempe Sports Complex, and the Wild Horse Pass Casino.

Phoenix Union Station

The 2010 and 2018 proposals call for a major expansion of the facilities at Phoenix Union Station. The station would have two island platforms for three through tracks and two additional island platforms for three termination tracks that would serve western service only.

See also
 Commuter rail in North America

References

External links
 Maricopa Association of Governments, 2018 Regional Commuter Rail System Study Update
 Arizona planners eye passenger rail linking Phoenix, Tucson  ABC 15
 Train to Phoenix could be $10 billion, 10 years off Tucson.com
 Commuter Rail Planning  Maricopa Association of Governments

Proposed rail infrastructure in the United States
Transportation in Arizona